The Frienstein, also called the Vorderes Raubschloss, is a rock formation, about 130 metres high, in Saxon Switzerland. It lies on the northern slopes of the Großer Winterberg in the Affensteine rocks. On the rock there was once a watchtower of the Barony of Wildenstein. Today the Frienstein is a popular  climbing peak .

History 
Around 1410 a watchtower was erected on the Frienstein as a signal station by the Barony of Wildenstein that was owned by the family of Berka of Dubá. By this means it was possible for Frienstein to make contact with the surrounding watchtowers on the Winterstein, the Neuer Wildenstein and the Alter Wildenstein. In 1451 the Frienstein together with the rest of the barony went to the House of Wettin and thus to the Electorate of Saxony. In the period that followed, robber knights lodged on the Frienstein, even in 1479 one of their workers conceded that "item near Frienstein is a trap..., where those who are caught are tormented" (item beym Freynstein ist eyn loch ..., do man die gefangen eynfurt zu peynigen). On the first cartographic record in Saxony, a map dating to  1592 by Matthias Oeder, the rock is marked as Freystein.

On the present-day climbing route called the Alter Weg ("Old Way") one can still see the rebates and steps cut out of the rock that were once used to climb it. Even on the summit area there are traces of the watchtower in the shape of rebates for anchoring a wooden observation post.
On the eastern side at the foot of the rock is the Ida Grotto (Idagrotte), a large crevice and bedding cave, that is nowadays a popular destination. It can only be reached over a narrow band of rock. In the grotto there are still traces of its medieval use as a living area.

Because of its size and the fact that it is easy to get to, the Ida Grotto is a popular goal for Boofers, a Saxon term for hikers who sleep out in the open. However, in recent years, there have been repeated cases of hikers who have fallen and been seriously injured or killed as a result of being intoxicated with alcohol.

Climbing peak 
The Frienstein is a popular climbing peak in the Saxon Switzerland Climbing Region, but its summit is not accessible to hikers and walkers. The first recreational ascent of the peak took place in 1873, although it had been conquered before with the help of artificial aids. The route known today as the Alter Weg is classified as climbing grade III. There are also more difficult routes of up to grade XIb. Climbing history was written on the Königshangel when grade IX was reached for the first time in Saxon Switzerland. In 1965 it was successful climbed for the first time by Fritz Eske, after several unsuccessful attempts by other noteworthy climbers.

References

Sources 
Peter Rölke (publ.): Wander- & Naturführer Sächsische Schweiz, Vol. 1, Verlag Rölke, Dresden 1999,

External links 
The Frienstein at the rock information pages of the German Alpine Club 

Rock formations of Saxon Switzerland
Climbing areas of Germany
Mountains of Saxon Switzerland